The Dalhousie Student Union (DSU) is the official representative of students at Dalhousie University in Halifax, Nova Scotia.

History 

On November 10, 1869 students accepted ownership of the Dalhousie Gazette from the founding editors.

A referendum was held February 18–19, 1960, regarding the question of a Student Union Building being built on campus. 90.2% of voters backed the idea.  83.2% of students turned out to vote.

On November 8, 1968, the Student Union Building was opened. The cost of the building eventually was $3,700,000. The construction of the building was made possible in part by the province of Nova Scotia, which granted a loan of $2,766,600 to the Student Union. The SUB loan was retired in 1982.

The CRTC approved student-operated campus radio station CKDU's application for an FM broadcasting license in October 1984. The station's first broadcast was Friday, February 1, 1985, at 3:30 p.m.

The Dalhousie Student Union was a founding member of the Canadian Federation of Students in 1981 but withdrew its membership in 1994. In that same year, it became a founding member of the Canadian Alliance of Student Associations.

In 2003 the DSU helped found the Alliance of Nova Scotia Student Associations, later named Students Nova Scotia, Nova Scotia's provincial student advocacy group. On February 27, 2015, the DSU council voted on and subsequently passed a motion to remove its membership from Students Nova Scotia.

Structure 
The DSU is run by a Council consisting of members elected by either the student body directly in open elections, or appointed by certain student societies. The Council meets every two weeks during the school year, and monthly during the summer.  The Council has the ability to approve budgets and expenditures on behalf of the student body.

Day-to-day operations of the DSU are managed by the Executive, which is headed by the DSU President.  The Executive has the ability to execute its functions and spend its budget as approved by Council, but any new programs or substantial changes must first be approved by Council.

The DSU also represents students on the Dalhousie Board of Governors and Senate, and to external organizations.  The DSU is granted seven seats on the Senate and three on the Board of Governors.  Traditionally, one member of the executive will fill one of these seats and the remainder are filled by students chosen during an election.  Students sitting on the Board of Governors or Senate also hold a seat on the DSU Council.

DSU elections are held annually, usually in the first week of March.  They are preceded by a week of campaigning by the candidates.  In the 2007 general election, the voter turnout rate was 21%.

The union also employs full-time staff to manage the Student Union Building, the Grawood campus bar, research, communications and reservations for building facilities. All full-time staff are managed by the student union executive.

References

External links

Tiger Society Website

Students' associations in Canada
Student political organizations